Frie Leysen (19 February 1950 – 22 September 2020) was a Belgian festival director. She was director of the art centre deSingel from 1980 until 1991. In 1994, she co-founded the Kunstenfestivaldesarts in Brussels.

Biography 
Frie Leysen was born in Hasselt on 19 February 1950 as the daughter of Bert Leysen, the first programming director of the NIR, and the twin sister of actor Johan Leysen. She studied Medieval Art History at the University of Leuven.

Leysen was the first director of art centre deSingel in Antwerp from 1980 to 1991. The first edition of the festival took place in May 1994. Under her direction the festival became an internationally acclaimed major event for Belgian and international performing artists. Frie Leysen started curating several international projects. In 2007 she organized Meeting Points, a multidisciplinary festival taking place in nine different Arabic cities (Amman, Damascus, Beirut, Ramallah, Cairo, Alexandria, El Minia, Tunis and Rabat), as well as in Brussels and Berlin. She curated the Theater der Welt in 2010, was an artistic director at Berliner Festspiele in 2010-12, and was the artistic director of the Wiener Festwochen in 2013–14. She curated the performing arts program of Homeworks 7 in Beirut in 2015.

After a period of illness, Leysen died on 22 September 2020 aged 70.

Awards 
In 1991 she received the Award ‘Arkprijs van het Vrije Woord’ (Ark Prize of Free Speech). She was awarded the Flemish Community Award for general cultural contributions in 2003, an honorary doctorate from the Free University of Brussels, and the Erasmus Prize in 2014. In 2018 she received the “Bernadette Abraté Award”, given by the French speaking theatre critics in Brussels, Belgium. The Award was given to her and Christophe Slagmuylder for their work at the Kunstenfestivaldesarts. On 28 August 2019 Frie Leysen received the EFFE lifetime achievement award. The EFFE, the European Festivals Association, acknowledged her commitment to artists and her actions for artists’ creative freedom.

References

External link

1950 births
2020 deaths
Festival directors
Catholic University of Leuven alumni
People from Hasselt